South Pacific Island Airways (SPIA) was an airline operating  flights in the Pacific including American Samoa and Hawaii with service to the west coast of U.S. and Canada as well as to Alaska, New Zealand, Guam and Tahiti from 1973 to 1987. The Federal Aviation Administration (FAA) grounded the carrier in 1984, when it almost flew a charter flight into the airspace of the Soviet Union. SPIA was allowed to continue operations after some management changes were made at the airline, but was grounded again in 1985 due to some allegedly questionable dealings involving engine hush kits for its Boeing 707 jetliners. South Pacific continued to operate limited services until it ceased all operations in 1987.

Destinations
South Pacific Island Airways served these destinations during its existence primarily flying Boeing 707 jet aircraft although small de Havilland Canada DHC-6 Twin Otter turboprops were used for feeder service as well:

Canada
Vancouver, British Columbia - Vancouver International Airport

Fiji
Suva, Fiji - Nausori International Airport

Tahiti
Papeete, Tahiti - Fa'a'a International Airport

Tonga
Nuku'alofa, Tonga - Fua'amotu International Airport

New Zealand
Auckland, New Zealand - Auckland International Airport

Cook Islands
Rarotonga - Rarotonga International Airport

Palau
Koror, Palau - Roman Tmetuchl International Airport

Papua New Guinea
Port Moresby, Papua New Guinea - Jacksons International Airport

United States
Anchorage, Alaska - Ted Stevens Anchorage International Airport
Honolulu, Hawaii - Honolulu International Airport

American Samoa
Pago Pago, American Samoa - Pago Pago International Airport
Ofu-Olosega American Samoa - Ofu Airport
Tau, American Samoa - Tau Airport

Guam
Agana, Guam - Antonio B. Won Pat International Airport

Northern Mariana Islands
Rota - Benjamin Taisacan Manglona International Airport
Saipan - Francisco C. Ada/Saipan International Airport
Tinian - Tinian International Airport

Fleet

As its peak South Pacific Island Airways fleet included:

Accidents and Incidents 
 On July 21, 1984, South Pacific Island Airways Flight 513, a de Havilland Canada DHC-6 Twin Otter carrying 14 occupants, crashed upon landing at Tau Airport. While on final approach to the airport, the flight controls suddenly collapsed forward, and the nose of the aircraft pitched up. The Twin Otter then collided with a terminal building and a vehicle. One passenger was killed; the other 10 passengers and all 3 crew members survived. The investigation revealed that the elevator control cable was rusted, corroded, and broken due to inadequate inspection. The cable pulley in the area was also damaged. The corrosion of the control cable was worsened by the fact that the aircraft was operated in a humid and salty environment.

See also 
 List of defunct airlines of the United States

References 

Defunct airlines of American Samoa
Airlines established in 1973
Airlines disestablished in 1987
American companies disestablished in 1987
American companies established in 1973
Defunct airlines of the United States